Like an Animal may refer to 

 "Like an Animal" (The Glove song), 1983
 "Like an Animal" (Rüfüs song), 2015
 "Like an Animal" (Piqued Jacks song), 2023